Anderson Lake is a 28-acre lake in Cook County, Minnesota which is tributary to the Poplar River. It consists of a western lobe of 15 acres and an eastern lobe of 13 acres. Anderson Lake should not be confused with the Anderson Lake which is tributary to the Temperance River and lies slightly more than one mile northwest.

References

Lakes of Cook County, Minnesota
Lakes of Minnesota
Superior National Forest